Erosion (usually represented by ⊖) is one of two fundamental operations (the other being dilation) in morphological image processing from which all other morphological operations are based. It was originally defined for binary images, later being extended to grayscale images, and subsequently to complete lattices. The erosion operation usually uses a structuring element for probing and reducing the shapes contained in the input image.

Binary erosion 

In binary morphology, an image is viewed as a subset of a Euclidean space  or the integer grid , for some dimension d.

The basic idea in binary morphology is to probe an image with a simple, pre-defined shape, drawing conclusions on how this shape fits or misses the shapes in the image. This simple "probe" is called structuring element, and is itself a binary image (i.e., a subset of the space or grid).

Let E be a Euclidean space or an integer grid, and A a binary image in E.
The erosion of the binary image A by the structuring element B is defined by:

,

where Bz is the translation of B by the vector z, i.e., .

When the structuring element B has a center (e.g., a disk or a square), and this center is located on the origin of E, then the erosion of A by B can be understood as the locus of points reached by the center of B when B moves inside A. For example, the erosion of a square of side 10, centered at the origin, by a disc of radius 2, also centered at the origin, is a square of side 6 centered at the origin.

The erosion of A by B is also given by the expression: , where A−b denotes the translation of A by -b.

This is more generally also known as a Minkowski difference.

Example 

Suppose A is a 13 x 13 matrix and B is a 3 x 3 matrix:

     1 1 1 1 1 1 1 1 1 1 1 1 1        
     1 1 1 1 1 1 0 1 1 1 1 1 1    
     1 1 1 1 1 1 1 1 1 1 1 1 1    
     1 1 1 1 1 1 1 1 1 1 1 1 1   
     1 1 1 1 1 1 1 1 1 1 1 1 1                
     1 1 1 1 1 1 1 1 1 1 1 1 1               1 1 1
     1 1 1 1 1 1 1 1 1 1 1 1 1               1 1 1
     1 1 1 1 1 1 1 1 1 1 1 1 1               1 1 1
     1 1 1 1 1 1 1 1 1 1 1 1 1        
     1 1 1 1 1 1 1 1 1 1 1 1 1    
     1 1 1 1 1 1 1 1 1 1 1 1 1    
     1 1 1 1 1 1 1 1 1 1 1 1 1   
     1 1 1 1 1 1 1 1 1 1 1 1 1

Assuming that the origin B is at its center, for each pixel in A superimpose the origin of B, if B is completely contained by A the pixel is retained, else deleted.

Therefore the Erosion of A by B is given by this 13 x 13 matrix.
   
     0 0 0 0 0 0 0 0 0 0 0 0 0
     0 1 1 1 1 0 0 0 1 1 1 1 0
     0 1 1 1 1 0 0 0 1 1 1 1 0
     0 1 1 1 1 1 1 1 1 1 1 1 0
     0 1 1 1 1 1 1 1 1 1 1 1 0
     0 1 1 1 1 1 1 1 1 1 1 1 0 
     0 1 1 1 1 1 1 1 1 1 1 1 0
     0 1 1 1 1 1 1 1 1 1 1 1 0 
     0 1 1 1 1 1 1 1 1 1 1 1 0 
     0 1 1 1 1 1 1 1 1 1 1 1 0
     0 1 1 1 1 1 1 1 1 1 1 1 0
     0 1 1 1 1 1 1 1 1 1 1 1 0
     0 0 0 0 0 0 0 0 0 0 0 0 0
This means that only when B is completely contained inside A that the pixels values are retained, otherwise it gets deleted or eroded.

Properties

 The erosion is translation invariant.
 It is increasing, that is, if , then .
 If the origin of E belongs to the structuring element B, then the erosion is anti-extensive, i.e., .
 The erosion satisfies , where  denotes the morphological dilation.
 The erosion is distributive over set intersection

Grayscale erosion

Denoting an image by f(x) and the grayscale structuring element by b(x), where B is the space that b(x) is defined, the grayscale erosion of f by b is given by

,

where "inf" denotes the infimum.

In other words the erosion of a point is the minimum of the points in its neighborhood, with that neighborhood defined by the structuring element. In this way it is similar to many other kinds of image filters like the median filter and the gaussian filter.

Erosions on complete lattices

Complete lattices are partially ordered sets, where every subset has an infimum and a supremum. In particular, it contains a least element and a greatest element (also denoted "universe").

Moreover, let  be a collection of elements from L.

I.e.:
 ,
 .

See also
Mathematical morphology
Dilation
Opening
Closing

References 

 Image Analysis and Mathematical Morphology by Jean Serra,  (1982)
 Image Analysis and Mathematical Morphology, Volume 2: Theoretical Advances by Jean Serra,  (1988)
 An Introduction to Morphological Image Processing by Edward R. Dougherty,  (1992)
 Morphological Image Analysis; Principles and Applications by Pierre Soille,  (1999)
 R. C. Gonzalez and R. E. Woods, Digital image processing, 2nd ed. Upper Saddle River, N.J.: Prentice Hall, 2002.

Digital geometry
Mathematical morphology